The following is an episode list for the ABC sitcom television series Mork & Mindy. The series ran from September 14, 1978, to May 27, 1982, with a total of 91 episodes (split into 95 for syndication).

Series overview

Episodes

Season 1 (1978–79)

Season 2 (1979–80)

Season 3 (1980–81)

Season 4 (1981–82)

See also
 List of Happy Days episodes

References

External links
 
 

Mork and Mindy